Ku Kyung-Hyun (born April 30, 1981) is a South Korean football player who since 2009 has played for Jeju United FC. He formerly played for FC Seoul and Gwangju Sangmu.

References

1981 births
Living people
South Korean footballers
South Korean expatriate footballers
FC Seoul players
Gimcheon Sangmu FC players
Jeju United FC players
K League 1 players
Expatriate footballers in Indonesia
South Korean expatriate sportspeople in Indonesia
Association football midfielders